Tarun Tejpal (born 15 March 1963) is an Indian journalist, publisher, novelist and former editor-in-chief of Tehelka magazine. In November 2013, he stepped down as editor for six months after a female colleague accused him of sexual assault. On 21 May 2021, a Goa trial court presided over by Justice Kshama Joshi acquitted him of all charges.

Early life
Tejpal's father was in the Indian Army, as a result he grew up in many parts of the country. He graduated in economics from Punjab University in Chandigarh. Tejpal married Geetan Batra in 1985; they have two daughters, Tiya and Cara.

Career
In the 1980s he began his career with The Indian Express and later moved to New Delhi to join a now defunct magazine called "India 2000". In 1984, he joined India Today magazine, then The Financial Express in 1994 and later became the founding editor of India's second largest newsmagazine publication, Outlook. Meanwhile, he founded a publishing company, "India Ink", which published Arundhati Roy's Booker Prize winning novel The God of Small Things in 1998.

In February 2000, Tarun Tejpal set up India's first journalistic website, Tehelka. Tejpal in several media interviews declared the primary impulse of Tehelka would be editorial and not commercial, and it would aim to bring back the aggressive public interest journalism of the 1980s which had been misplaced in the fashion, food and cinema excitements of the 1990s. "Tehelka.com" did its first sting operation on India-South Africa cricket match fixing in 2000. A book about the exposé, Fallen Heroes, was published soon after. The Tehelka portal soon came to be known for its sting investigations, mainly for Operation West End (defence deal bribes). In 2004, "Tehelka.com" made a switch from online portal to print media when it was relaunched as Tehelka national weekly newspaper in tabloid format, which became a weekly magazine in January 2007.
Tehelka's landmark stories include the Gujarat killings, Dr Binayak Sen, police encounters in the north-east, coal and 2G scams, the Ishrat Jahan and Tulsi Prajapati murders, the organising of riots by rump groups, an exposé on Zaheera Sheikh (witness of the Best Bakery case); as well as its persuasive reportage on the oppressed and disadvantaged sections of India – Dalits, tribals, poor and other minorities, victims of buccaneering development.
Tehelka's reporters and writers won every journalistic award – including three years of the Chameli Devi for the best national woman journalist of the year and two IPI (International Press Institute) awards for the best journalism of the year as well as the Sanskriti Journalism Award, Statesman Award for Rural Reporting, Ramnath Goenka Award for Northeast Reporting and multiple South Asia Laadli Media & Advertising Awards.

Literary works 
Tejpal's debut novel The Alchemy of Desire (2006), won Le Prix Mille Pages for Best Foreign Literary Fiction. It was published in over 20 languages and went on to sell more than half-a-million copies. The book also gained substantial attention for the rare and powerful praise it garnered from Nobel laureate Sir V S Naipaul, who wrote “at last — a new and brilliantly original novel from India.” Khushwant Singh in his review wrote, “The Alchemy of Desire puts Tarun Tejpal in the front rank of Indian novelists. I am inclined to agree with Naipaul: Tejpal has turned out a masterpiece. It is a novel that must be read.’  Writing of the book, Le Figaro said “This Indian masterpiece is like a voyage down the Ganges, long and infinitely pleasurable; the only thing that worries you is getting to the end too soon.”

A foiled assassination bid on Tejpal in 2001, and the arrest of five contract killers became the seed of Tejpal's second literary novel, the critically acclaimed The Story of My Assassins (2010) on which the 2020 web series Paatal Lok on Amazon Prime is based. The Valley of Masks (2011) was longlisted for Man Asian Literary Prize 2011.

Awards
 In 2001, named among the "50 leaders at the forefront of change in Asia" by Business Week.
 In 2006, named in the list of "India's elite", for being a "Pioneer of a brand of sting journalism which has transformed Indian media", by The Guardian.
 In 2006–07, won Le Prix Mille Pages award for his debut novel The Alchemy of Desire.
 In 2009, named among "India's 50 Most Powerful People 2009" by "Business Week".
 In 2010, bestowed with "Award for Excellence in Journalism" by the International Press Institute's India Chapter Award
 In 2011, selected as GQ India's man of the year.
The Alchemy of Desire: won Le Prix Mille Pages for Best Foreign Literary Fiction shortlisted for Prix Femina
The Valley of Masks: longlisted for the Man Asian Booker Prize

Controversies

There was controversy with allegations of conflict of interest related to the ownership of company that owned "Tehelka" as political and business houses held shares in the company. K. D. Singh, a Trinamool Congress Rajya Sabha member, owned a part of the holding company, so did "Anant Media Private Limited" which was majority owned by "Alchemist group" conglomerate under investigation by the Serious Fraud Investigation Office.

In November 2013, Tejpal was accused by a reporter of sexual assault during Think in Goa. He admitted "misconduct", and offered to take six months leave, as "penance", from Tehelka. This received intense public attention and media scrutiny especially because Tejpal and his magazine had previously been involved in highlighting the issue of sexual violence in India, including in a special issue on the topic in February of the year. Police in the state of Goa, where the incident took place, filed a First Information Report (FIR) which listed charges, including rape, against him. Police also announced they had seized CCTV footage from the Grand Hyatt hotel, the site of the alleged incident. On 22 November 2013, the same day the presence of CCTV was announced by the prosecution, Tejpal issued a press release demanding that the CCTV footage seized by the police immediately be released to the public. Tejpal also denied all charges against him. A non-bailable warrant was issued against him by the Goa Police. Consequently, he was arrested by Goa police on 30 November 2013. On 1 July 2014, Supreme Court granted him bail and asked him to submit his passport to the court.

The trial began in September 2017, then was temporarily deferred when Tejpal appealed to the Supreme Court that the charges be quashed. He also moved the Supreme Court to be given a copy of the CCTV footage, which the court directed the police to comply with. The court rejected his plea on quashing charges in August 2019, sent the trial back to the lower court, which it directed to complete in six months. The Goa sessions court deferred the judgement to 19 May 2021. On 21 May 2021, Tejpal was acquitted of all charges. The 527-page judgement substantially relied on CCTV footage of the ground floor and second floor of the Grand Hyatt hotel, the site of the alleged incident, to acquit the former editor. Justice Kshama Joshi also noted substantial investigative bias and lacunae by the Investigating Officer in the case. Highlighting the right to a fair trial guaranteed to an accused under Article 21 of the Constitution, the verdict listed over 40 aspects of investigative lacunae and failure by the investigating officer including the destruction of key evidence that would "conclusively corroborate the defense of the accused," page 433 of the verdict noted. "The IO has in some cases, such as the CCTV footage of the first floor of block 7 of the Grand Hyatt, entirely destroyed the evidence...", the verdict stated.

See also
 Radia tapes controversy

References

External links

 Tarun Tejpal, website
 Tehelka magazine, website
 Tehelka (Hindi), website
 Sleaze, senseless greed and dirty heroes
 The Rediff Interview/ Tarun Tejpal at Rediff.com, 2001.
Tarun Tejpal Remembering the Original Chocolate Boy Of Bollywood in His Birthday Month

Living people
Indian magazine founders
Indian magazine editors
Indian publishers (people)
1963 births
English-language writers from India
Indian male novelists
Indian investigative journalists
Indian activist journalists
Indian prisoners and detainees
People from Jalandhar
Businesspeople from Punjab, India
20th-century Indian novelists
Novelists from Punjab, India
20th-century Indian journalists
Indian male journalists
Journalists from Punjab, India
21st-century Indian journalists
20th-century Indian male writers